Karel Jan (Arjan) Breukhoven (Rotterdam, 18 May 1962) is a Dutch musician.

Education
Breukhoven started his musical training with Jan Brandwijk. He later studied principal professional organ and church music at the Royal Academy in the Hague with Wim van Beek and Bert Matter. He studied piano with Albert Brussee, and also singing, improvisation and choir direction. In this academy time he also got lessons from the French organist and pedagogue Gaston Litaize. He also attended choir and orchestra direction with professor Kurt Thomasstichting.

Performances
Breukhoven acts as a pianist, organist, soloist, as well as accompanying musician for soloists and choirs. He also works as a conductor. He has collaborated with a lot of other musicians like Ernst-Daniël Smid, Vicki Brown, Berdien Stenberg, Marco Bakker, Ben Cramer, Kamahl, Henk Poort, Marjolein Keuning, Margriet Eshuijs and Cor Bakker. He played with Louis van Dijk and Daniël Wayenberg, among others. In 2007 he celebrated his 25th year's jubilee as a musician by concerts with baritone Ernst-Daniël Smid and two concerts in Bruges' Church of Our Lady and Ghent's Saint Bavo and moreover with an organ concert on Garrels-orgel in the Great Church of Maassluis.

The largest organ which he ever played was a 127-voice organ at Saint Patrick' s basilica in the Australian city of Fremantle.

Activities
Breukhoven regularly gives concerts in the Netherlands, elsewhere on the continent and in Australia. He appeared on the EO programme "Nederland zingt" and is a regular guest on their radio programmes. He conducts three male choirs:
The Christian men's choir "Prince Alexander" in Rotterdam (over 80 members).
The Dutch Christian men's choir in Berkel en Rodenrijs (over 130 members).
Randstedelijk men's Choir from Spijkenisse (over 100 members).

As a pianist and an organist he has developed his own style of improvisation, both in classic and in light recent development. He composes for choir, organs and other instruments. He is the organist of the reformed church of Berkel and Rodenrijs. He is frequently requested as organist at funeral ceremonies in the Netherlands.

Awards
Arjan Breukhoven received the silver honours in 2008 from the main board for church stewardship in the Protestant Church in the Netherlands for working as an organist in that church for more than 25 years.

Selected discography
He collaborated on more than 150 CD and DVD-records. A selection is shown below:

External links 
Website of Arjan Breukhoven

1962 births
Living people
Dutch composers
Dutch organists
Male organists
Dutch pianists
Musicians from Rotterdam
21st-century pianists
21st-century organists
21st-century male musicians